Iruvar Ullam is a 1963 Indian Tamil-language romance film, directed by L. V. Prasad and written by M. Karunanidhi. Based on Lakshmi's novel Pen Manam, the film stars Sivaji Ganesan and B. Saroja Devi, while M. R. Radha, S. V. Ranga Rao, T. R. Ramachandran, T. P. Muthulakshmi, Sandhya and Padmini Priyadarshini play supporting roles.

The music was composed by K. V. Mahadevan, while the lyrics were written by Kannadasan. K. S. Prasad and A. Sanjeevi handled cinematography and editing respectively. The filming was held in places like Kodaikanal, Kanyakumari and Bangalore.

Iruvar Ullam was released on 29 March 1963 and became a box office. Clips of the film were used to portray the younger Ganesan and Saroja in the 1997 film Once More, which Saroja Devi considered a sequel to Iruvar Ullam.

Plot 

Selvam, the younger son of a prosecutor Neethimanickam, is a medical student studying in Bangalore. Unlike his righteous father, he is a playboy. Vasanthi, a scheming woman, tries to blackmail Selvam into marriage. On his refusal, she writes to his father. Selvam's uncle Gnanasigamani, another lawyer, arrives in Bangalore and pays 10,000 to Vasanthi to silence her.

Selvam stops studying and arrives in Madras. He takes over the responsibility of managing his uncle's company. He eventually sees Shanta, a teacher, on the road and pursues her. Shanta dislikes Selvam's continuing old habits, but he eventually transforms and wants to live prosperously with her, yet she continues disliking him.

Shanta is eventually forced by her parents to marry Selvam. When Vasanthi is murdered by her other lover Paramathma, Selvam is wrongfully convicted; this brings the couple closer. Shantha later exposes Paramathma, and Selvam is released.

Cast 
Sivaji Ganesan as Selvam
B. Saroja Devi as Shanta
M. R. Radha as Gnanasigamani
S. V. Ranga Rao as Neethimanickam
T. R. Ramachandran as Sri Paramathma
T. P. Muthulakshmi as Kannamma
Sandhya as Nagammal
Padmini Priyadarshini as Vasanthi
K. Balaji as Minor Manickam
S. Rama Rao as Gurusamy, Shanta's father
A. Karunanidhi as Soda Subbaiah, Gurusamy's father-in-law
R. Balasubramanian as Nagamma's brother
Lakshmi Rajyam as Gurusamy's second wife
Radha Bai as School Headmistress

Production 
Iruvar Ullam was directed by L. V. Prasad and produced by A. Anand under Prasad Movies. The film is based on Lakshmi's novel Pen Manam, which was previously adapted into the Telugu film Bharya Bhartalu (1961). Cinematography was handled by K. S. Prasad and the editing by A. Sanjeevi. The filming was held in places like Kodaikanal, Kanyakumari and Bangalore.

One scene in the film called for an aggressive performance by B. Saroja Devi. Sivaji Ganesan sought to outdo her acting in the scene. While it was being filmed, Prasad stopped filming and told Ganesan that he should not upstage Saroja Devi as the scene required her to dominate, and if Ganesan did so it would ruin the film. Ganesan complied, and at Prasad's request, underplayed his role. Iruvar Ullam was the final Tamil film directed by Prasad. The final length of the film was 35,441 feet (4,543 m).

Soundtrack 
The film's soundtrack and background score were composed by K. V. Mahadevan, while the lyrics for the songs were written by Kannadasan. A. L. Raghavan initially sang the song "Buddhi Sigamani", picturised on M. R. Radha, in a manner that would match Radha's hoarse voice, but Prasad did not accept this and told Raghavan to sing with a melodious voice. When Radha objected to Prasad's decision, Prasad said he would have the song recorded with a melodious voice, and if Radha did not like the final recording, it would be excluded from the film; after listening to the final recording, Radha approved.

Release and reception 
Iruvar Ullam was released on 29 March 1963, and distributed by Sivaji Films. It was promoted as a "newspaper cutting that featured pencil sketches of two hearts", each displaying the name of the lead actor and actress. On 9 April, The Indian Express wrote that it "has one significant and rare virtue. Its basic dramatic design is of a lightly pleasant variety, with the sweet underlining of a playful romance". On 21 April, the magazine Kalki positively reviewed the film, praising Saroja Devi for delivering a very natural performance. The film was a commercial success, running for over 100 days in theatres.

Legacy 
Film journalist Sujatha Narayanan considers Iruvar Ullam a trendsetter for "all following films that dealt with post-marriage narratives" in Tamil cinema. Clips of the film were used to portray the younger Ganesan and Saroja Devi in the 1997 film Once More, which Saroja Devi considered a sequel to Iruvar Ullam.

References

Bibliography

External links 

1960s romance films
1960s Tamil-language films
1963 films
Films based on Indian novels
Films directed by L. V. Prasad
Films scored by K. V. Mahadevan
Films with screenplays by M. Karunanidhi
Indian black-and-white films
Indian romance films